Ignacio Mendoza (born 6 June 1908, date of death unknown) was a Mexican sports shooter. He competed in the 50 metre pistol event at the 1960 Summer Olympics.

References

1908 births
Year of death missing
Mexican male sport shooters
Olympic shooters of Mexico
Shooters at the 1960 Summer Olympics
Sportspeople from Mexico City